African Americans in Mississippi or Black Mississippians are residents of the state of Mississippi who are of African American ancestry. As of the 2019 U.S. Census estimates, African Americans were 37.8% of the state's population which is the highest in the nation.

African Americans were brought to Mississippi for cotton production during the slave trade.

History 

In 1718, French officials established rules to allow the importation of African slaves into the Biloxi area. By 1719, the first African slaves arrived. Most of those early enslaved people in Mississippi were Caribbean Creoles.

As the demographer William H. Frey noted, "In Mississippi, I think it's [identifying as mixed race] changed from within." Historically in Mississippi, after Indian removal in the 1830s, the major groups were designated as black (African American), who were then mostly enslaved, and white (primarily European American). Matthew Snipp, also a demographer, commented on the increase in the 21st century in the number of people identifying as being of more than one race: "In a sense, they're rendering a more accurate portrait of their racial heritage that in the past would have been suppressed."

After having accounted for a majority of the state's population since well before the Civil War and through the 1930s, today African Americans constitute approximately 37 percent of the state's population. Some of these slaves were mixed race, with European ancestors, as there were many children born into slavery with white fathers. Some also have Native American ancestry. During the first half of the 20th century, a total of nearly 400,000 African Americans left the state during the Great Migration, for opportunities in the North, Midwest and West. They became a minority in the state for the first time since early in its development.

Lynching

The late 1800s and early 1900s in the Mississippi Delta showed both frontier influence and actions directed at repressing African Americans. After the Civil War, 90% of the Delta was still undeveloped. Both whites and African Americans migrated there for a chance to buy land in the backcountry. It was frontier wilderness, heavily forested and without roads for years. Before the start of the 20th century, lynchings often took the form of frontier justice directed at transient workers as well as residents.

Whites accounted for just over 12 percent of the Delta region's population, but made up nearly 17 percent of lynching victims. So, in this region, they were lynched at a rate that was over 35 percent higher than their proportion in the population, primarily due to being accused of crimes against property (chiefly theft). Conversely, blacks were lynched at a rate, in the Delta, lesser than their proportion of the population. However, this was unlike the rest of the South, where blacks comprised the majority of lynching victims. In the Delta, they were most often accused of murder or attempted murder, in half the cases, and 15 percent of the time, they were accused of rape, meaning that another 15 percent of the time they were accused of a combination of rape and murder, or rape and attempted murder.

A clear seasonal pattern to lynchings existed with colder months being the deadliest. As noted, cotton prices fell during the 1880s and 1890s, increasing economic pressures. "From September through December, the cotton was picked, debts were revealed, and profits (or losses) realized... Whether concluding old contracts or discussing new arrangements, [landlords and tenants] frequently came into conflict in these months and sometimes fell to blows." During the winter, murder was most cited as a cause for lynching. After 1901, as economics shifted and more blacks became renters and sharecroppers in the Delta, with few exceptions, only African Americans were lynched. The frequency increased from 1901 to 1908 after African Americans were disfranchised. "In the twentieth century Delta vigilantism finally became predictably joined to white supremacy."

Conclusions of numerous studies since the mid-20th century have found the following variables affecting the rate of lynchings in the South: "lynchings were more numerous where the African American population was relatively large, the agricultural economy was based predominantly on cotton, the white population was economically stressed, the Democratic Party was stronger, and multiple religious organizations competed for congregants."

By the 1950s, the civil rights movement was gaining momentum. A 1955 lynching that sparked public outrage about injustice was that of Emmett Till, a 14-year-old boy from Chicago. Spending the summer with relatives in Money, Mississippi, Till was killed for allegedly having wolf-whistled at a white woman. Till had been badly beaten, one of his eyes was gouged out, and he was shot in the head. The visceral response to his mother's decision to have an open-casket funeral mobilized the black community throughout the U.S. Vann R. Newkirk| wrote "the trial of his killers became a pageant illuminating the tyranny of white supremacy". The state of Mississippi tried two defendants, but they were speedily acquitted by an all-white jury.

Notable people

 Mae Bertha Carter - Figure of the Civil Rights Movement
 Aunjanue Ellis - Actress
 Fannie Lou Hamer - Figure of the Civil Rights Movement
 John M. Perkins - Figure of the Civil Rights Movement
 B.B. King - Musician
 Oprah Winfrey - Television personality, actress, producer
 Jerry Rice - NFL Football Player with the San Francisco 49ers
 Walter Payton NFL Football Player with the Chicago Bears
 Brandy Norwood Singer, actress
 Jerome Barkum - NFL Football Player with the New York Jets
 Lester Young - Musician, Tenor Saxophone
 Muddy Waters -  Musician
 Howlin Wolf - Musician
 Elmore James - Musician
 Swae Lee - Musician
 Karlous Miller - Comedian
 James Earl Jones - Actor
 Ray J - Singer, TV Personality, singer
 Sam Cooke - Singer
 Robert Johnson - Musician
 Ruby Bridges - Activist
 Medgar Evers - Activist
 Ida B. Wells - Activist
 Big K.R.I.T - Rapper
 Cassi Davis - Actress
 Shelby McEwen - Athlete
 Frederick O'Neal - Actor
 Beah Richards - Actress
 David Banner - Musician
 Rick Ross - Musician
 Soulja Boy - Musician

See also

 Education segregation in the Mississippi Delta
 History of slavery in Mississippi
Mississippi-in-Africa
 Mississippi Masala
Black Southerners
Demographics of Mississippi
List of plantations in Mississippi
List of African-American historic places in Mississippi
List of African-American newspapers in Mississippi
Vietnamese in Mississippi
History of Italians in Mississippi
African Americans in Alabama
African Americans in Tennessee
African Americans in Louisiana

References

Sources

External links
Black Life on the Mississippi: Slaves, Free Blacks, and the Western Steamboat World
 Black History in Mississippi
 African American
 Slave Trade
 African-Americans in the Mississippi River Valley, 1851-1900
 A Contested Presence: Free Black People in Antebellum Mississippi, 1820–1860
 African Presence in Mississippi